The Japanese language has some words and some grammatical constructions associated with men or boys, while others are associated with women or girls. Such differences are sometimes called "gendered language".

In general, the words and speech patterns associated with men are perceived as rough, vulgar, or abrupt, while those associated with women are considered more polite, more deferential, or "softer". Some linguists consider the description of "rough–soft continuum" more accurate than the description of "male–female continuum". For example, Eleanor Harz Jorden in Japanese: The Spoken Language refers to the styles as "blunt/gentle", rather than male/female.

There are no gender differences in written Japanese (except in quoted speech), and almost no differences in polite speech (teineigo).

Conventional women's speech

The word , which is usually translated as "ladylike" or "feminine," refers to the behaviour expected of a typical Japanese woman in a customary scene.  As well as behaving in particular ways, being onnarashii means conforming to particular styles of speech.  Some of the features of women’s speech include speaking in a higher register, using more polite forms and using polite speech or honorifics in more situations, and referring to themselves and those whom they address more formally.

Some linguistic features commonly associated with women include: omission of the copula da, the use of first person pronouns such as watashi or atashi among others, use of feminine sentence-final particles such as wa, na no, kashira, and mashō, and the more frequent use of the honorific prefixes o- and go-.

Actual language used by Japanese-speaking women differs from these ideals. Such onnarashii speech is a social norm that institutions such as education and media encourage women to adopt. Similarly, these forms may be prescribed for women learners by Japanese textbooks and other materials. There are, however, various deviations from these norms in conversation.

Although Japanese women may not follow the gender norm in speech, some linguistic studies indicate that Japanese women tend to use more honorific language than men do, which reinforces the idea of onnarashii and conventional gender roles.

Conventional men's speech

Just as there are modes of speaking and behaviour that have sometimes been considered intrinsically feminine, there are also those that are considered . Based on men's reports of their own speech, as well as prescriptive advice for language use, men's language is thought of as using fewer polite forms, distinct pronouns and sentence-final particles, and some reduced vowels.

Some words associated with men's speech include: the informal da in place of the copula desu, first person pronouns such as ore and boku, and sentence-final particles such as yo, ze, zo, and kana. Masculine speech also features less frequent use of honorific prefixes and fewer aizuchi response tokens.

Research on Japanese men's speech shows greater use of "neutral" forms, forms not strongly associated with masculine or feminine speech, than is seen in Japanese women's speech.

Some studies of conversation between Japanese men and women show neither gender taking a more dominant position in interaction. Men, however, tend to show a "self-oriented conversation style", telling stories and expressing their expertise on topics being discussed more than is typical of women in these studies.

In modern society
Since the late twentieth century observers have noted that individual Japanese men and women do not necessarily speak in the ways attributed to their gender. Scholars have described considerable variation within each gender; some individuals use these characteristics of gendered speech, while others do not. Upper-class women who did not conform to conventional expectations of gendered speech were sometimes criticized for failing to maintain so-called "traditional Japanese culture".

In the LGBT community

Okama entertainers and onē kotoba 
Another recent phenomenon influencing gender norms in speech is the popularity of  entertainers, typically men who enact very feminine speech, dress, and other gender markers. The word okama originally referred to feminine male homosexuals, but its usage has expanded to refer to masculine gay men, male cross-dressers, and trans women, among other uses. Entertainers who identify as okama sometimes use a form of speech called , literally "older sister speech" but with the word onē ("older sister") used to denote an effeminate man, a speaking style that combines the formal aspects of women's speech described above with blunt or crude words and topics. For example:
あたし 今 カレー 食ったら 下痢 だ わ。
Atashi ima karē kuttara geri da wa.
"If I ate curry now, I'd get diarrhea."
The pronoun atashi and the sentence-final da wa is typical of women's speech, while the verb kuttara is typical of men's speech and the topic itself is very blunt.

Celebrities and tarento who use onē kotoba include Akihiro Miwa, Shōgo Kariyazaki, IKKO, Kaba-chan, and the twin brothers Osugi and Peeco. Maree argues that they were attempting to avoid both heteronormative femininity and stereotypes of lesbians as masculine.

Onabe and transgender male speakers 
The word , although it originally referred to masculine lesbians and female cross-dressers, has evolved to include trans men. Onabe hosts interviewed in the 1995 documentary Shinjuku Boys use a variety of gendered markers in their speech that are traditionally considered feminine or masculine. One speaker exclusively uses the reflexive pronoun  as a gender-neutral first-person pronoun but also utilizes ending particles like na no, while another uses the first-person pronoun ore but does not consider himself a man or a woman. Abe further notes that two onabe included in a round table discussion in the bisexual and lesbian magazine Anise used jibun as a first-person pronoun, while trans men preferred boku.

See also
Japanese pronouns
Gender-neutral pronoun: Japanese
Language and gender
Nyōbō kotoba

References

Further reading
 
 
 
 
  London: Cambridge University Press.
 

Japanese language
Society of Japan
Japanese
Japanese
Sociolinguistics
Japanese honorifics